Kyzyl-Alay also known as Chagyr is a mountain village in Osh Region of Kyrgyzstan, near highway M41. It is part of the Alay District. Its population was 1,310 in 2021.

Nearby towns and villages include Ak-Bosogo and Chong-Karakol.

References

External links 
 Map at fallingrain.com

Populated places in Osh Region